Anil Gurung (born 17 September 1986) is a Nepali footballer who plays as a striker for Brigade Boys Club in the Martyr's Memorial A-Division League.

He took retirement from the national team duty after 2019 AFC Asian Cup qualification – Third Round match against  Philippines on 14 November 2017, which was his 50th cap for the national team.

Early life
Anil Gurung was born to late Mr. Bil Bahadur Gurung and Mrs. Laxmi Kumari Gurung who is an inhabitant of Malepatan, Pokhara. He completed his school education from Barahi Secondary School, during then, he started playing football from the age of thirteen. He started his career from Sahara club, Pokhara in 2001. Anil's parents believed that sports can't help earn a living and urged him to join the army. Although his family opposed him, he kept playing.

He made headlines when he was selected for a trial for Chelsea reserve team and Woking F.C  in England. Sahara Club, Nepal and Sahara Football Club, UK jointly initiated the trial-selection process. Sahara Club (Pokhara), a local football Club in Pokhara, which has branches in the UK, had applied for Anil’s trial. In England, Gurung went through a four-month-long trial, where he put his footballing skills to the test. Chelsea F.C. took care of all his footballing expenses during the trial period.

Domestic career and achievements
In his domestic league, Anil previously played for Brigade Club, Three Star Club, New Road Team (NRT) and Manang Marshyangdi Club. Anil proved himself in Nepali football by scoring 32 goals and becoming the highest scorer in the 2009 edition of Martyrs Memorial A Division Football League for this achievement he won a Yamaha motorcycle . He won a cash prize of Rupees fifty thousand in one of the matches of the 10th edition of SAFF games for having an outstanding performance. In one of the matches in Itahari Gold Cup 2063 BS he was tagged as man of the match. In the 10th Buddha Subba Gold Cup, he was the highest scorer and was duly selected as the best player of the tournament. He was also chosen as best player during a match in the 2064 BS edition of Governor Gold Cup. He was selected as the best player in the yearly match organized by the Nepal Khel Khud Patrakar Manch. Likewise, in the yearly match held in Kaski district, he received a cash prize of Rs. 30,000. Thus, his career was bombarded with trophy and prizes. Due to his success, he is also regarded as one of the most successful and highly paid player of Nepal. Anil Scored first Head goal against Bangladesh on SAFF Championship held in Kathmandu August, 2013.

Chelsea trials
Anil Gurung is the player from Nepal UK jointly were engaged in lobbying for his selection for the trial phase. Anil, during a farewell Programme hosted by Sahara club, Pokhara said, "Opportunities don't come very often and I am going to the make the best of it."  During the event, he expressed his love for football and a dream to popularise the name of the country by football. Before leaving, Anil Gurung said, "I am very happy to represent Nepal. I don’t mind if I am not selected there. It is my honor that I am called by them. I will try my best to show Nepalis' talents abroad. I also want to prove that Nepali players are capable of performing well if they are provided with opportunities". Although he didn't find success in Chelsea and Woking, he was welcomed home as a hero.

I-League and Shillong Lajong
Previously, Anil was called by Shillong Lajong FC but as he had to go UK for the trial, he refused to play for that club. On October 30, 2009, Anil signed a three-year contract with Indian I-League club Shillong Lajong FC for an amount of Nrs.6.3 million. Anil made his debut for Lajong in a scoreless draw against Salgoacar SC on 2 November 2009.
His contract with Lajong made him the highest paid Nepali footballer. 
Anil Gurung helped Lajong FC to garner a point when he scored the equalizer in the 90th minute of the match against Viva Kerala in their latest I-League encounter. In the 3rd E.K. Nayanar Memorial Gold Cup he scored the only goal to send Shillong Lajong FC into the semifinal at the expense of Pune FC. He was also in the squad of Shillong Lajong, that finished runners-up in the 2009–10 Indian Federation Cup.

Return to Manang Marshyandi Club
The relegation of Shillong Lajong FC led the need for Anil Gurung to find top tier football. He terminated the contract with the Indian outfit. It was revealed that he had joined the former club Manang Marshyandi Club for an undisclosed fee assumed to make him the highest paid player in Nepal. The club cited the need for such contract as the player is highly rated and can gain interest of several foreign league clubs. He endured a sweet return assisting and scoring in the first match against Friends Club. He scored on his second match against Machindra F.C. and another in fourth start against Koilapani Polestar. He then scored only at the end games of the season, a hat-trick against his former club Brigade Boys and the final match against Nepal Police Club. It was just an average performance by his standard to get runners-up medal.

2012-13 (2069 B.S.) Season

The Season started brightly for Anil Gurung after being named captain for Manang Marshyandi. He led them to glory in Ncell Cup and Safal Cup.
They are also in good position in the league.

2014-15

In the opening match of the 2014–15 Martyr's Memorial A-Division League Gurung captained his side and scored the third goal in MMC's 3-0 victory over  Far Western FC.

International career
Gurung made his international debut against Oman in a world cup qualifier that Nepal lost 2-0 on 8 October 2007 at Muscat. 
He has won 50 caps and has 9 goals to his name. Anil became the first Nepalese player to score goal in home ground in world-cup qualifying match. Gurung took retirement from the national team duty after the clash against the Philippines on 14 November 2017.

Style of play
He is generally deployed as  supporting striker with another player in the 4-4-2 formation but can act as play maker (He wears the No-10 Shirt in national team) in  3-4-3 or 4-5-1 formation just behind the lone striker. He is the preferred penalty taker. In one of his recent interview, he said Neymar was his favourite player and aims to endorse Neymar's playing style in the pitch. Despite his short height, he is well built-in player and uses low centre of gravity to the cut pass or hold players in the opposition box.

Career statistics

Club

International

International goals
Scores and results list Nepal's goal tally first.

Prominent Tournaments Played

Achievements
 In the year 2003, he participated in the competition Sahid Smarak League from Manang Marshayandi Club and was able to bag a grand prize of Rs 1,00,000 for the highest goal scorer of the tournament.
In the year 2006, he scored 32 goals in Martyrs' Memorial 'A' Division League where he bagged Yamaha Motorcycle as a highest goal scorer of the tournament award. 
In the year 2013, he won NCELL Player of the year award where he bagged Hyundai EON. 
In the year 2014, he was adjudged Most Valuable Player of First Khaptad Gold Cup Football Tournament where he bagged Yamaha Motorcycle. 
In the year 2016, he was adjudged Most Valuable Player of Manakama Cable Car Gold Cup Football Tournament where he bagged Yamaha Motorcycle.

International

 First Prime Minister Cup
 Winner: 2009
AFC Solidarity Cup
Winner: 2016

References

External links

1986 births
Living people
People from Pokhara
Nepalese footballers
Nepal international footballers
Manang Marshyangdi Club players
Nepalese expatriate footballers
Expatriate footballers in India
Nepalese expatriate sportspeople in India
Shillong Lajong FC players
I-League players
Association football forwards
Gurung people